Bessemer may refer to:

Places

Canada
Bessemer, Ontario

United States
Bessemer, Alabama
Bessemer Airport
Bessemer Civic Center  
Bessemer, Colorado
Bessemer, Michigan
Bessemer City, North Carolina
Bessemer, Ohio
Bessemer, Pennsylvania (disambiguation), multiple locations
Bessemer Mountain, a summit in Washington state
Bessemer Township, Michigan
A fictitious town in Upstate New York in David Stout's novel The Night of the Ice Storm

Other uses
 The Bessemer process, the first inexpensive industrial production method for steel
Bessemer (surname)
 SS Bessemer, a Victorian experimental paddle steamer
 Bessemer, a GWR 3031 Class locomotive

See also
 

German-language surnames